Team for Colombia, popularly known as the Experience Coalition or Coalition of the Regions, is a centre-right and right-wing  political coalition in Colombia. It was formed to participate in the 2022 Colombian presidential election with Federico Gutiérrez as candidate.

Composition

Members

Support

References

2021 establishments in Colombia
Political parties established in 2021
Political party alliances in Colombia